División de Honor may refer to a number of sports leagues:

Argentina
Argentine División de Honor de Futsal, the highest level of men's futsal in Argentina

Spain
División de Honor de Béisbol, the highest level of men's baseball in Spain
División de Honor Juvenil de Fútbol, the highest level of men's under-18 football in Spain
División de Honor Andaluza, the sixth level of men's football in Spain under the region of Andalusia
División de Honor de Álava, the sixth level of men's football in Spain under the region of Álava, Basque Country
División de Honor de Gipuzkoa, the sixth level of men's football in Spain under the region of Gipuzkoa, Basque Country
División de Honor de Vizcaya, the sixth level of men's football in Spain under the region of Biscay, Basque Country
División de Honor de Futsal, now known as Primera División de Futsal, the highest level of Spanish men's futsal
División de Honor de Balonmano, now known as Liga ASOBAL, the highest level of men's handball in Spain
División de Honor Femenina de Balonmano, the highest level of women's handball in Spain
División de Honor de Hockey Hierba, the highest level of men's hockey in Spain
División de Honor Femenina de Hockey Hierba, the highest level of women's hockey in Spain
División de Honor de Rugby, the highest level of men's rugby union in Spain
División de Honor Femenina de Rugby, the highest level of men's rugby union in Spain
División de Honor de Waterpolo, the highest level of men's waterpolo in Spain
División de Honor Femenina de Waterpolo , the highest level of women's waterpolo in Spain

Peru
División de Honor de Fútbol Sala, the highest level of men's futsal in Peru

See also
División de Honor B (disambiguation)